The 1931 Brooklyn Dodgers season was their second in the league. The team failed to improve on their previous season's output of 7–4–1, winning only two games. They were shut out in eight of their fourteen games and finished ninth in the league.

Schedule

Standings

References

Brooklyn Dodgers (NFL) seasons
Brooklyn Dodgers (NFL)
Brooklyn
1930s in Brooklyn
Flatbush, Brooklyn